The Italian Democratic Socialist Party (PSDI) is a minor social-democratic political party in Italy established in 2004 as the continuation of the historical Italian Democratic Socialist Party, so that the new PSDI numbers its congresses in perfect continuity with the old PSDI. After being part of The Union in 2006, the party supported The People of Freedom (PdL) of the centre-right coalition in 2013, while in 2018 it supported Forza Italia, which succeeded the PdL.

The PSDI retains some support locally in the South, especially in Apulia. In 2005, the party's list won 2.2% of the vote and got one deputy elected to the Regional Council. In 2010, the party was not able to file a list and lost its regional representation.

History

Re-foundation of the PSDI
At the end of 2003, several former members of the PSDI, who initially converged in the Italian Democratic Socialists, reorganized the Italian Democratic Socialist Party. In January 2004, the XXIV National Congress of the PSDI was held. Giogio Carta was named new secretary and Antonio Cariglia was named honorary president of the party. The legal continuity of the party was sanctioned by the Supreme Court of Cassation in 2004.

In the 2005 Apulian regional election, the PSDI won 2.2% of the vote along with other two minor parties and got one deputy elected to the Regional Council. The party did not repeat itself in the 2010 Apulian regional election, when it was not able to file a list.

Legal dispute and split
In the 2006 Italian general election, Carta was elected to the Chamber of Deputies and resigned as secretary in November. He was replaced by Renato D'Andria, whose election was contested by many members of the party (including Carta) on the basis that it was rigged. The new secretary consequently ousted all the members who contested his election (including Carta) from the party.

In April 2007, a tribunal in Rome sided with the former leadership and declared invalid both the election of D'Andria as secretary and the XVII Congress of the party, which confirmed him as leader in January. The party was led ad interim by Carta until the Congress of October 2007 (the XVII, as that of January was declared invalid) elected Mimmo Magistro as new secretary. D'Andria, who continued to consider himself to be the legitimate leader of PSDI, launched in June his Party of Democratic Reformers (PRD), open to "socialists, Christians, radicals, liberals, republicans and greens".

2008 general election
For the 2008 Italian general election, the PSDI tried to form an alliance with the Union of the Centre (UDC); in the end, it did not participate with the UDC coalition. On 29 March 2008, the National Committee proposed to its members and voters to vote according to their conscience, favouring those political forces that could stop the emerging two-party system. Most regional sections, on the example of Tuscany, indicated to vote for the Socialist Party in the election of the Chamber of Deputies and for The Left – The Rainbow in the election of the Senate of the Republic. Some regional sections made different indications, notably in Veneto and Lazio in favour of the UDC, in Lombardy in favour of  the PdL, and in Sicily in favour of the Movement for Autonomy.

Failed recomposition
In July 2011, a tribunal in Rome declared Renato D'Andria legitimate secretary of the party. Magistro proposed a reconciliation between the two factions; D'Andria did not accept the conditions posed by him. In mid November 2011, 28 members out of 31 of the outgoing National Council, including Magistro, left the PSDI in order to form a new party named Social Democrats (iSD). On 11 January 2012, on the 65th anniversary of the split of Palazzo Barberini, the PSDI and iSD organized a common event in remembrance of Saragat. A recomposition was made difficult by the fact that D'Andria was keen on an alliance with the centre-right (three MPs of PdL, namely Massimo Baldini, Giancarlo Lehner, and Paolo Russo, were close to the new PSDI), while Magistro aligned the iSD with the centre-left.

2013 and 2018 general election
In the 2013 Italian general election, the PSDI supported the PdL. In the run-up of the 2018 Italian general election, the PSDI decided to side with the centre-right Forza Italia, successor of the PdL.

In 2022, Carlo Vizzini, a former leader of the historical PSDI and later senator of Forza Italia, was elected secretary of the party. The PSDI did not in the 2022 Italian general election. According to a faction, the party logo was not deposited at the Ministry of the Interior due to uncertainties about its legitimacy, while the iSD would be the continuation of the historical party.

Leadership
Secretary: Giorgio Carta (2004–2007), Mimmo Magistro (2007–2011), Renato D'Andria (2011–2022), Carlo Vizzini (since 2022)
President:  Alberto Tomassini (2007–2010), Angelo Scavone (2010–2011)
Honorary president: Antonio Cariglia (2005–2006), Giorgio Carta (2007–2008)

References

Social democratic parties in Italy
Political parties established in 2004
2004 establishments in Italy